Saambou-Nasionale Bouvereniging v Friedman 1979 (3) SA 978 (AD), sometimes called Saambou v Friedman, was a landmark decision in the Appellate Division of the Supreme Court of South Africa, with crucial implications for contract in that country, as Jansen JA accepted the reliance theory into South African law, citing Smith v Hughes.

References
Saambou-Nasionale Bouvereniging v Friedman 1979 (3) SA 978 (AD), on appeal from Saambou National Building Society v Friedman 1977 (3) SA 268 (W)
Dale Hutchinson. "Contract Formation". Zimmermann and Visser (eds). Southern Cross: Civil Law and Common Law in South Africa. Clarendon Press. 1996. Page 190.

1979 in South African law
1979 in case law
Appellate Division (South Africa) cases
South African contract case law